HMS C29 was one of 38 C-class submarines built for the Royal Navy in the first decade of the 20th century.

Design and description
The C-class boats of the 1907–08 and subsequent Naval Programmes were modified to improve their speed, both above and below the surface. They displaced  on the surface and  submerged. The C-class submarines had a crew of two officers and fourteen ratings.

For surface running, the boats were powered by a single 12-cylinder  Vickers petrol engine that drove one propeller shaft. When submerged the propeller was driven by a  electric motor. They could reach  on the surface and  underwater.

The boats were armed with two 18-inch (45 cm) torpedo tubes in the bow. They could carry a pair of reload torpedoes, but generally did not as they would have to remove an equal weight of fuel in compensation.

Construction and career
HMS C29 was built by Vickers, Barrow. She was laid down on 4 June 1908 and was commissioned on 17 September 1909. The boat sank a merchant ship while patrolling the Gulf of Riga in the Baltic.

C29 was involved in the use of the U-boat trap tactic. The tactic was to use a decoy trawler to tow a submarine. When a U-boat was sighted, the tow line and communication line was slipped and the submarine would attack the U-boat. The tactic was partly successful, but was abandoned after the loss of two C-class submarines. In both cases, all the crew were lost. C29 was one of the two C-class submarines sunk while attempting to employ the tactic; she was mined when her trawler Ariadne strayed into a minefield in the Humber Estuary on 29 August 1915.

Notes

References

External links
 HMS C29 Roll of Honour
 'Submarine losses 1904 to present day' - Royal Navy Submarine Museum 

 

British C-class submarines
Royal Navy ship names
Ships built in Barrow-in-Furness
World War I shipwrecks in the North Sea
Ships sunk by mines
Lost submarines of the United Kingdom
Maritime incidents in 1915
1909 ships
Ships lost with all hands
Protected Wrecks of the United Kingdom